Misurata Stadium is a football stadium in Misurata City, North West Libya. It was the previous home of the Libyan national team and hosted some of the country's 2006 World cup qualifiers, most notably against Cameroon, where they restricted the Indomitable Lions to a 0-0 draw.

The stadium is the home of Asswehly, but also hosts matches that involve Misurata's other clubs, such as Alittihad.

The stadium has a capacity of 10,000.

References 

Football venues in Libya
Misrata